The Guatapé is a river in Antioquia Department, Colombia and a tributary of the Samaná Norte River. The Jaguas (170 MW), Las Playas (204 MW) and San Carlos (1240 MW) hydroelectric power plants are located on its stem.

References

Rivers of Colombia
Geography of Antioquia Department